Catephia is a genus of moths of the family Erebidae. Most species of this genus are found in Africa.

Description
Palpi smooth and reaching just above vertex of head. Thorax hairy. Abdomen with dorsal tufts and ridges of scales on proximal segments. Tibia hairy and spineless. Forewings with nearly rectangular apex.

Species
The species of this genus are:
 Catephia abrostolica Hampson, 1926
 Catephia albifasciata (Pinhey, 1968)
 Catephia albirena Hampson, 1926
 Catephia albomacula (Draeseke, 1928)
 Catephia alchymista (Denis & Schiffermüller, 1775)
 Catephia barrettae Hampson, 1905
 Catephia cana (Brandt, 1939)
 Catephia compsotrephes Turner, 1932
 Catephia corticea Le Cerf, 1922
 Catephia cryptodisca Hampson, 1926
 Catephia dentifera (Moore, 1882)
 Catephia diphteroides (Moore, 1885)
 Catephia dipterygia Hampson, 1926
 Catephia discophora Hampson, 1926
 Catephia endoplaga Hampson, 1926
 Catephia eurymelas Hampson, 1916
 Catephia flavescens Butler, 1889
 Catephia holophaea Hampson, 1926
 Catephia iridocosma (Bethune-Baker, 1911)
 Catephia javensis Hampson, 1926
 Catephia lobata (Prout, 1928)
 Catephia melanica Hampson, 1926
 Catephia mesonephele Hampson, 1916
 Catephia metaleuca Hampson, 1926
 Catephia microcelis Hampson, 1926
 Catephia molybdocrosis Hampson, 1926
 Catephia nigrijuncta (Warren, 1914)
 Catephia nigropicta (Saalmüller, 1880)
 Catephia obscura (Wileman, 1914)
 Catephia oligomelas (Mabille, 1890)
 Catephia olivacea (Walker, 1863)
 Catephia pallididisca Hampson, 1926
 Catephia pericyma Hampson, 1916
 Catephia personata Walker, 1865
 Catephia philippinensis Wileman & West, 1929
 Catephia poliochroa Hampson, 1916
 Catephia pyramidalis Hampson, 1916
 Catephia sciachroa Hampson, 1926
 Catephia sciras Fawcett, 1916
 Catephia scotosa (Holland, 1894)
 Catephia scylla Fawcett, 1916
 Catephia serapis Fawcett, 1916
 Catephia shisa Strand, 1920
 Catephia sospita Fawcett, 1916
 Catephia squamosa Wallengren, 1856
 Catephia striata Hampson, 1902
 Catephia stygia Hampson, 1926
 Catephia thricophora Hampson, 1894
 Catephia triphaenoides Viette, 1965
 Catephia virescens Hampson, 1902
 Catephia xanthophaes (Bethune-Baker, 1911)
 Catephia xylois (Prout, 1925)

Former species
 Catephia arctipennis Hulstaert, 1924
 Catephia canescens Hampson, 1926
 Catephia gravipes (Walker, 1858) (Nagia)
 Catephia linteola Guenée, 1852 (Nagia)
 Catephia melas (Bethune-Baker, 1906)
 Catephia pauli Holloway, 1976 (Ecpatia)
 Catephia perdicipennis (Moore, 1882)
 Catephia sthenistica (Hampson, 1926) (Nagia)
 Catephia susanae Holloway, 1976 (Ecpatia)

References

 

 
Catephiini
Moth genera